Gelechia basipunctella is a moth of the family Gelechiidae. It is found in from central Europe to Russia (Middle Volga, southern Ural, southern Siberia), Turkey and Mongolia.

The larvae feed on Salix species.

References

Moths described in 1854
Gelechia
Moths of Europe